A posthumous trial or post-mortem trial is a trial held after the defendant's death. Posthumous trials can be held for a variety of reasons, including the legal declaration that the defendant was the one who committed the crime, to provide justice for society or family members of the victims, or to exonerate a wrongfully convicted person after their death. Due to the heavy cost, they are usually held only under extraordinary circumstances.

Notable posthumous trials
 Cadaver Synod of Pope Formosus
 Farinata degli Uberti
 Pope Boniface VIII
 Retrial of Joan of Arc, overturned her earlier heresy conviction.
 Francesco Maria Carafa, resulting in exoneration.
 The Wanli Emperor, seized and denounced by Beijing's Red Guards in 1966.
 Wu Xun
 Henry Plummer, resulting in a mistrial.
 Sergei Magnitsky

See also
 Kangaroo court
 Trial in absentia
 Declared death in absentia
 Show trial

References

Criminal justice
Legal aspects of death